Sir John Gurdon (born 1933) is a Nobel-winning biologist.

John Gurdon may also refer to:
 John Gurdon (died 1623), MP for Sudbury
 John Gurdon (died 1679), MP for Ipswich, Suffolk and Sudbury
 John Gurdon (died 1758), MP for Sudbury
 John Everard Gurdon, First World War flying ace